Tarpon Springs High School is a public high school in Tarpon Springs, Florida. The school graduated its first class of seniors in the year 1906.
The school is known for its football team, music conservatory, culinary department, and veterinary academy. Its mascot is the Spongers, reflecting the town's history of sponge diving. The student body was composed of 89% white, 4% African-American, 3% Hispanic, 2% Asian, 2% Mixed-Race, and 0% American Indian. The majority of the school body was of Greek descent.

Programs

Clubs 

The school in 2006 had more than 20 clubs, including: 

 Academic Team 
 Art Club 
 Crime Watch
 DCT
 Drama Club 
 Fellowship of Christian Athletes 
 French Club
 French National Honor Society
 Future Business Leaders of America (FBLA)
 Future Educators of America
 Greek Club 
 Health Occupations Students Of America 
 Interact
 Japanese Club
 Key Club
 Latin Club
 Maroon Mob
 Mu Alpha Theta (math honor society)
 Multicultural Club
 National Honor Society
 Peer Connectors
 Physics Club
 Poetry Club
 Science National Honor Society
 Spanish Honor Society
 Student Council
 Turning Point USA
 Wild Side 
 Yearbook

Notable alumni 

Nikitas Loulias, Archbishop of Thyateira and Great Britain (2019-)
 Gus Bilirakis, politician
 Becky Burleigh, University of Florida Women’s Soccer Coach
 Mike Gruttadauria, former NFL player
 Bertie Higgins, singer-songwriter
Scottie James (born 1996), basketball player for Hapoel Haifa in the Israeli Basketball Premier League
Traci Koster, politician and attorney 
 Don Smith, former NFL player for the Denver Broncos
 Kipp Vickers, former NFL player
 Ted Watts, former NFL player

References

External links
Tarpon Springs High School

High schools in Pinellas County, Florida
Public high schools in Florida
Buildings and structures in Tarpon Springs, Florida
Educational institutions established in 1905
1905 establishments in Florida